Paramocis is a genus of moths of the family Erebidae. It contains only one species, Paramocis maculata, which is found in Sumatra, Indonesia.

References

External links

Euclidiini
Monotypic moth genera
Moths of Indonesia